Vermilion-Viking was a provincial electoral district in Alberta, Canada, mandated to return a single member to the Legislative Assembly of Alberta using first past the post method of voting from 1971 to 1993.

Vermilion-Viking is named for the Town of Vermilion and the Town of Viking.

Members of the Legislative Assembly (MLAs)

Electoral history

1971 general election

1975 general election

1979 general election

1982 general election

1986 general election

1989 general election

See also
List of Alberta provincial electoral districts
Vermilion, Alberta, a town in Alberta
Viking, Alberta, a town in Alberta

References

Further reading

External links
Elections Alberta
The Legislative Assembly of Alberta

Former provincial electoral districts of Alberta